Langzhong Airport is an airport being constructed to serve the city of Langzhong in Southwest China's Sichuan Province. It is located in the town of Shilong (石龙) in Langzhong. The official name of the airport is proposed to be Langzhong Guzhen Airport (阆中古城机场), named after Lanzhong's historic city centre.

Construction for the airport first began in 1994, after receiving approval from the national government of China in August 1992. However, work was later stopped for shortage of funds. Meanwhile, nearby Guangyuan Panlong Airport and Nanchong Gaoping Airport, which were started later, were completed and opened to the public.

In December 2018, construction for Langzhong Airport resumed after a hiatus of more than 20 years, as the growing popularity of Langzhong as a tourist destination provides new justification for building the airport. The construction budget is 960 million yuan, and the airport is projected to open in December 2022.

Langzhong Airport will have a  runway (class 4C) and a  terminal building.

See also
List of airports in China
List of the busiest airports in China

References 

Airports in Sichuan
Proposed airports in China
Buildings and structures in Nanchong